Orta, formerly Kari Pazarı, is a town in Çankırı Province in the Central Anatolia region of Turkey. It is the seat of Orta District. Its population is 3,635 (2021).

See also
Gökçeören, Orta

References

External links
 District municipality's official website 

Populated places in Orta District
Towns in Turkey